Coliseo General Rumiñahui is an indoor sporting arena located in Quito, Ecuador. The capacity of the arena is 16,000 and is used mostly for basketball, Volleyball and others Sports. It was built on July 9, 1992. It is also used for music concerts and other events.

Concerts and events
Def Leppard - April 15, 1997
Fiestas de Quito 2003 - I Encuentro Internacional de Cheerleaders - November 21–23, 2003 - 10h00
Maná - April 10, 2003 and April 17, 2008
Shakira - July 24, 1996, and December 2, 2006
RBD - April 21, 2007 and December 12, 2008
WWE SmackDown!/ECW - February 12, 2008
Wisin & Yandel - April 30, 2008
Jesus' Name Apostolic Church of Ecuador - Fiftieth Anniversary Celebration - August 28–30, 2009
Backstreet Boys - March 8, 2011
Roxette - April 19, 2012
Laura Pausini - August 28, 2016
Judas Priest - October 28, 2018
Slayer - September 26, 2019
Tini - August 31, 2022

Sports venues in Quito
Indoor arenas in Ecuador
Sports venues completed in 1992
Basketball venues in Ecuador
Volleyball venues in Ecuador
1992 establishments in South America